Mehrabad (also Romanized as Mehrābād) is a village in Pirakuh Rural District, in the Central District of Jowayin County, Razavi Khorasan Province, Iran. At the 2006 census, its population was 13, in 6 families.

References 

Populated places in Joveyn County